The Temple of Mercury was a sanctuary in Ancient Rome on the Aventine Hill, which was dedicated to god Mercury.  The temple was founded in 495 BC. It was one of the oldest temples in Rome. It is known  to have still existed in the 3rd century.  If in use into the 4th century, it would have been closed during the persecution of pagans in the late Roman Empire.

See also
List of Ancient Roman temples

References

Temples of Mercury
5th-century BC religious buildings and structures

Destroyed temples